Sedeh (also known asSeh Deh, Sehdeh-e Bālā, and Side) is a village in Belesbeneh Rural District, Kuchesfahan District, Rasht County, Gilan Province, Iran. At the 2006 census, its population was 2,175, in 586 families.

References 

Populated places in Rasht County